Héritage was a banner of discount grocery stores owned by Provigo to market smaller supermarkets in Quebec.  Launched on February 24, 1982 by Provigo's Econoprix subsidiary, the first store was on Taschereau Boulevard in Saint-Hubert.

The Héritage banner replaced ex-Provigo, Dominion, Jato and AVA locations in the 1980s. Seven Steinberg's locations were transformed into Héritage stores in 1992.
 
In 1995, in a move to save costs by avoiding duplication associated in having two different banners as well as to increase its purchase power among the suppliers,  Provigo folded the 42 Héritage stores into Maxi, a higher end supermarket chain that offered more choices to consumers. Héritage had almost twice the number of stores that Maxi  had by the time the merger was announced.

In 2014, a plan by Provigo's owner Loblaws to revive the Héritage name (by converting 12 company-owned Maxi stores into franchises) was cancelled.

References

External links
 Provigo Inc. (Answers.com) -- Provigo, Maxi & Héritage Brands

Companies based in Montreal
Retail companies established in 1982
Retail companies disestablished in 1995
Defunct supermarkets of Canada